Filipe Miguel Neves Ferreira (born 27 September 1990) is a Portuguese professional footballer who plays for Boavista F.C. mainly as a left-back but also as a left midfielder.

He made over 175 appearances in the Primeira Liga, mostly for Belenenses but also Nacional, Tondela and Boavista.

Club career
Born in Lisbon, Ferreira began his senior career at hometown club Atlético Clube de Portugal in the third division, winning promotion in 2010–11 and making his professional debut in the Segunda Liga the following season. A year later, he moved across the league and the capital city to C.F. Os Belenenses, playing 19 matches in all competitions as the team won the league title; he subsequently extended his contract from 2014 to the following year.

Ferreira featured regularly in his debut campaign in the Primeira Liga, and scored the winner in a 2–1 home victory over S.C. Braga on 2 February 2014 that ended a nine-game winless run. In July 2016, once his contract expired, he signed a two-year deal at F.C. Paços de Ferreira in the same competition.

In July 2018, Ferreira moved abroad for the first time, signing for SK Sturm Graz of the Austrian Football Bundesliga. Having made only four appearances in all tournaments, he returned the following January to his own country's top flight by joining C.D. Nacional on loan until 30 June; his registration at the Madeiran club was delayed for bureaucratic reasons.

Following Nacional's relegation, in July 2019 Ferreira made a permanent move back to the top tier on a two-year contract at C.D. Tondela. On 12 July 2021, he signed with Boavista F.C. for one season.

International career
Ferreira played twice for the Portugal under-21 side, in March 2011 friendlies. He earned his first cap against the Republic of Ireland (2–0 win), and his second three days later against Denmark (1–1).

Personal life
Ferreira's father, José Carlos, was also a footballer and a defender.

References

External links
 

1990 births
Living people
Portuguese footballers
Footballers from Lisbon
Association football defenders
Association football midfielders
Primeira Liga players
Liga Portugal 2 players
Segunda Divisão players
Atlético Clube de Portugal players
C.F. Os Belenenses players
F.C. Paços de Ferreira players
C.D. Nacional players
C.D. Tondela players
Boavista F.C. players
Austrian Football Bundesliga players
SK Sturm Graz players
Portugal under-21 international footballers
Portuguese expatriate footballers
Expatriate footballers in Austria
Portuguese expatriate sportspeople in Austria